McPhail is a surname. Notable people with the surname include:

Addie McPhail (1905–2003), American film actress
Alastair McPhail, British diplomat, the first British ambassador to South Sudan
Andy McPhail, Scottish rugby league footballer who played in the 2000s
Billy McPhail (1928–2003), Scottish footballer
Bob McPhail (1905–2000), Scottish international footballer
Bob McPhail (rugby), English rugby union, and rugby league footballer who played in the 1900s
Bruce McPhail (1937–2020), New Zealand rugby player
Dan McPhail (1903–1987), Scottish professional footballer 
David McPhail (rugby league) (1886–?), New Zealand rugby league footballer who played in the 1900s and 1910s
David McPhail (1945–2021), New Zealand actor
Donna McPhail, British comedian, TV presenter, journalist
Douglas McPhail (1914–1944), American actor and singer
George Wilson McPhail (1815–1871), Presbyterian minister, president of Lafayette College, and Davidson College.
Hal McPhail (1912–1977), American football player
Jerris McPhail (born 1972), former professional American football player
John McPhail (disambiguation)
Larry McPhail (born 1968), retired American soccer forward
Malcolm McPhail (1895–1975), Scottish footballer
Marnie McPhail (born 1966), Canadian-American actress
Michael McPhail (born 1981), American Olympic rifle shooter
 Samuel McPhail (born 1826), American soldier, founder of the towns Caledonia and Redwood Falls
Sharon McPhail (born  1948), American lawyer and politician
Stephen McPhail (born 1979), Republic of Ireland international footballer

See also
Mount McPhail, Canada
Cobden/Bruce McPhail Memorial Airport, Ontario, Canada
McPhail Memorial Baptist Church, Ottawa, Canada
Fergus McPhail, Australian children's television programme
McPhail v Doulton (1970), landmark English trusts law decision by the House of Lords
MacPhail, a surname